The discography of American rapper Playboi Carti consists of three studio albums, one EP, three mixtapes and eleven singles (including six as a featured artist).

Playboi Carti, known as $ir Cartier at the time, self-released two mixtapes in November 2011 and November 2012: THC: The High Chronicles and Young Misfit. He changed his name to Playboi Carti in 2013. In 2016, he was signed to Interscope Records and ASAP Mob's imprint label AWGE.

In April 2017, Carti released his debut mixtape, which debuted at number 12 on the US Billboard 200 chart. It spawned two successful singles: "Magnolia" and "Woke Up Like This". In June 2017, he was named as one of the ten of XXL'''s "2017 Freshman Class".

In May 2018, he released his second studio album Die Lit. It debuted at number 3 on the US Billboard 200 chart.  His third studio album Whole Lotta Red released on Christmas Day 2020. It debuted at number 1 on the US Billboard 200 chart for his biggest selling chart debut yet.''

Albums

Studio albums

Mixtapes

Singles

As lead artist

As featured artist

Promotional singles

Other charted and certified songs

Guest appearances

Music videos

As lead artist

Notes

References

Discographies of American artists
Hip hop discographies